Toledo, officially the City of Toledo, is a 3rd class component city in the province of Cebu, Philippines. According to the 2020 census, it has a population of 207,314 people.

Toledo City is bordered to the north by the town of Balamban, to the west is the Tañon Strait, to the east is Cebu City and Naga and the town of Minglanilla, and to the south is the town of Pinamungajan.

On June 18, 1960, Toledo became a chartered city under Republic Act No. 2688.

Its patron saint is John of Sahagun and his feast day is celebrated every June 12.

History
It is formerly known as Pueblo Hinulawan.

Second World War
In 1942 the Japanese Imperial forces captured and occupied the town of Toledo.

In 1945, local Filipino forces of the Philippine Commonwealth Army from the 8th, 82nd, 83rd, 85th and 86th Infantry Division aided by Cebuano guerrilla resistance fighters, battled against the Japanese Imperial forces and liberated the town of Toledo.

Cityhood

On June 19, 1960, Toledo became a chartered city under Republic Act No. 2688. It was made into a city through the efforts of then Congressman Manuel A. Zosa, representative of the old Sixth District Cebu, who authored Republic Act No. 2688.

Although not as progressive as Cebu's other cities, it is unique in that it is the only city in the province on the western seaboard facing Negros Oriental – and therefore strategically located. (Danao, Mandaue, Lapu-Lapu, Cebu City, Talisay, Naga, and Carcar are on the east. One more city, Bogo, is in the north, on the eastern side.)

Shrine of Saint Pedro Calungsod
Following the canonization on October 21, 2012, of Visayan teen martyr Pedro Calungsod (1672), the hilltop parish of Cantabaco became the first shrine and church named after the second Filipino saint.

Geography

Barangays
Toledo is politically subdivided and comprises into 38 barangays:

Climate

Demographics

Economy 
Toledo City is known as the "Copper City". Carmen Copper Corporation a subsidiary of Atlas Consolidated Mining and Development Corporation operates the Toledo Copper mine covering 1,674 hectares. The mine is located in Barangay Don Andres Soriano (Lutopan), Toledo City. The copper concentrate are shipped and delivered mainly to smelting factories in China, India and Japan.

Aside from mining, Toledo City is also known as the "Power City" as a handful of power providers are located in the city. Global Business Power Corporation (GBP) is a holding company that has become the leading energy provider in the Visayas region. It owns Toledo Power Co. (TPC) which owns a 60 MW and 82 MW coal-fired power plants in Barangay Daanlungsod and a 40 MW diesel plant in Carmen; and Cebu Energy Development Corporation (CEDC), a 246 MW clean coal-fired power plant utilizing Circulating Fluidized Bed (CFB) boiler technology also located in Barangay Daanlungsod. Another coal-fired power plant is AboitizPower subsidiary Therma Visayas, Inc.(TVI) which has a net capacity of 300 MW located in Bato, Toledo City. Aside from coal-fired power plants, a 60 MW solar power plant is located in a 73-hectare property in Barangay Talavera owned by First Toledo Solar Energy Corporation a subsidiary of Citicore Power Inc. a community-focused renewable energy company. The National Grid Corporation (NGCP) currently has two substations in Toledo City located in Barangay Calong-calong and Magdugo.

Other companies in Toledo City include Atlas Fertilizer Corporation and San-Vic Agro-Builders, Inc. to name a few.

Shopping malls are also present in Toledo like Gaisano Grand, Gaisano Metro and Prince Warehouse Club.

Leisure time

The barangays of Cantabaco and Poog  have limestone cliffs that local climbers have developed into popular crags for sport climbing.

Gallery

Notable people 

 Máximo Macapobre was a 19th-century Philippines leader and activist.
 Senator John Henry Osmeña was Mayor of Toledo, 2013–2019.
 Anna Fegi – Singer
 Jay-R Siaboc – Actor, Singer and Finalist of Pinoy Dream Academy (season 1)

References

Sources

External links
 [ Philippine Standard Geographic Code]

Cities in Cebu
Port cities and towns in the Philippines
Populated places established in 1861
1861 establishments in the Philippines
Component cities in the Philippines